The Diaghilev Contemporary Art Museum is a state museum of contemporary Russian art located at St. Petersburg and affiliated with St. Petersburg State University.

History 
The museum was established in 2008 as one of the departments of St. Petersburg State University and on the basis of the collection of the Diaghilev Art Centre (1990-2008). The founder and the first director of the museum was Yurieva Tatiana, SPBU professor of Art history, art critic and americanist, one of the creators of the Diaghilev Art Centre

Collection 
The collection of the museum contains more than 300 items and includes paintings, sculptures, graphics and artworks in other media. The core of the collection is formed by the works of Leningrad independent artists of 1960-1980s, such as Alexandr Baturin, Anatoly Basin, Vladimir Ovchinnikov, Anatoly Vasiliev, Gleb Bogomolov, Anatoly Belkin, Alek Rapoport, Georgy Kovenchuk, Nikolai Timkov, Yevgeny Ukhnalyov, Vyacheslav Mikhaylov, Valery Lukka, Levon Lazarev.

The collection includes the works of such well known contemporary artists as Vitaly Pushnitsky, Elena Figurina, Ilya Gaponov, Marina Koldobskaya, Aleksei Iarygin, Tatiana Gubareva, Yury Shtapakov and others.

The museum's research programs and exhibition activity cause permanent enlarging and developing of the collection. Nowadays it also includes the collection of foreign contemporary art, representing the artworks of artists from Italy, Holland, USA, China and other countries.

References

External links
 
 Diaghilev Contemporary Art Museum at Goskatalog of museums of Russia 
 Diaghilev Contemporary Art Museum on the Russian Museums website

Art museums established in 2008
Contemporary art galleries in Russia
2008 establishments in Russia
Art museums and galleries in Saint Petersburg